Guttaring is a town in the district of Sankt Veit an der Glan in the Austrian state of Carinthia.

Geography
Guttaring lies between Krappfeld and Görtschitztal and is traversed by the Silberbach.

References

Cities and towns in Sankt Veit an der Glan District